Eugene A. Ronzani (March 28, 1909 – September 12, 1975) was a professional football player and coach in the National Football League (NFL). He was the second head coach of the Green Bay Packers, from 1950 to 1953, and resigned with two games remaining in the 1953 season.

A three-sport athlete at Marquette University, Ronzani earned nine varsity letters in college and was a backfield player in the NFL with the Chicago Bears for six seasons in the 1930s and two more in the mid-1940s.

Early years
Born and raised in Iron Mountain, Michigan in the state's Upper Peninsula, Ronzani's parents immigrated from Italy; his father Giovanni (John) arrived in 1898 and worked as miner and was naturalized in 1904. He was then able to send for his wife in Italy, Caterina Broglio Ronzani (Catherine), and their two oldest siblings. Five more children were born in Michigan, Gene was the fifth of the seven. He graduated from Iron Mountain High School in 1929, just across the state border with Wisconsin. Following two older brothers, he headed south to Milwaukee and enrolled at Marquette University.

Rare athlete at Marquette
Gene "Tuffy" Ronzani was a chief contributor to Marquette sports in the early 1930s as the first of two MU nine-letter athletes. He was born in Iron Mountain, a small mining town in Michigan's upper peninsula (on the Wisconsin border) and entered Marquette in the fall of 1929, following his two brothers Anthony and David Ronzani of a first generation Italian family. Gene went out for freshman football, track and basketball and made all three varsity teams his sophomore year. "I wasn't interested in individual records," he once mentioned. "What good does it do if you score all the points and the team loses? Why, I can't even remember my records."  But his records were history. In football under Coach Frank Murray, the 1930 team marched to a nine-game undefeated season under the sparkling leadership of Ronzani and John Sisk.  Tuffy played either quarterback or fullback on offense and safety or linebacker on defense. He and Sisk both were to become All-Americans.

Ronzani was second in scoring his sophomore year. During Ronzani's junior year the Hilltoppers (as Marquette teams were called then) compiled an 8-1 record.  As a senior, he led the gridders to a 5-3-1 record, not fully indicative of the hard-fought games and near misses.

While Ronzani was on the basketball squad the cagers did not suffer a losing season.  Marquette garnered records of 11-7, 11-8 and 14-3 under Coach Bill Shandler.  The Tribune said, "Ronzani particularly had a rollicking time of it, as he roamed all over the floor, scrambling anyone in his path and usually coming up with the ball in the wildest sort of melee."

In track, Ronzani under Coach Con Jennings, was a consistent team man in shot put and javelin. He competed with Marquette's 1932 Central Collegiate champions, and also tried out for the US Olympic team in the Spring of 1932.  After graduation Tuffy joined the Chicago Bears' National Football league championship drive.  After Ronzani's playing days, he joined the Bear coaching staff and served in a coaching position under The Coach and Bear owner George "Papa Bear" Halas until 1950.  In 1950, he was hired as head coach and General Manager of the Green Bay Packers.  Tuffy introduced the first Black American player into the Packer lineup as Green Bay's coach, a move he was widely criticized for at the time. As head coach and General Manager, Ronzani's first game was against the Detroit Lions at aging City Stadium in Green Bay. The 22,096 fans were first introduced to new green and gold uniforms. Both jerseys and pants were kelly green with gold numbers on the tops, two gold stripes around the upper sleeves, and a one-inch gold stripe down the side of each leg.

Ronzani's football genius originated such formations as the double-wing, the shotgun offenses and the umbrella defense. It is now believed that many of his formations were his way of confusing his good friend and then arch-rival George Halas.  Both coaches knew all too well each other's onfield football tactics.

In tribute to his fantastic career at Marquette, a Marquette Tribune story in 1932 honored him saying that "Ronzani easily finds a place for himself among Marquette's immortals."

Pro playing career
Ronzani entered the NFL three years before the first NFL Draft and played in the backfield for the Chicago Bears from 1933 to 1938.  At age 35, he returned to the Bears during World War II in 1944 as a replacement for quarterback Sid Luckman, and also played in 1945.

Coaching career

Minor league
In 1939, Bears' owner George Halas purchased the Newark Tornadoes of the American Association and renamed them the "Newark Bears." Ronzani was named the head coach of the New Jersey team and stayed for three years, until the league suspended play before the 1942 season. The American Association returned in 1946 as the "American Football League," and the minor league Bears moved from Newark to Akron, Ohio, where Ronzani resumed his duties as head coach.

Notre Dame
Ronzani was hired as the backfield coach at Notre Dame in March 1945, but he left in early September to rejoin the Bears as a player, weeks before the opener in late September.

Chicago Bears
Starting in 1947, Ronzani was brought up to the parent NFL club in Chicago. He was the backfield coach for three seasons under owner and head coach Halas.

Green Bay Packers
Ronzani became only the second head coach of the Green Bay Packers in February 1950, following the resignation of founder Curly Lambeau. After two 3–9 seasons in 1950 and 1951, the Packers were 6–3 in 1952, but finished at .500 with three straight losses. In January 1953, Ronzani agreed to a second three-year contract offered by the executive committee. The 1953 season held promise, but the Packers had a 2–6–1 record entering the Thanksgiving Day game at Detroit, in which they were defeated 34–15 on national television, outscored 27–0 in the second half. Ronzani resigned the next day with two games remaining and received a $7,500 severance. The Packers lost all eight games with the Lions in his four seasons as head coach, while Detroit won the NFL title in both 1952 and 1953. Packer assistant coaches Hugh Devore and Ray McLean shared the interim head coaching duties in final two games in California, both losses, and Green Bay ended 1953 at 2–9–1, last in the Western Conference. Ronzani was present in the press box at the San Francisco game.

Ronzani's legacy with the Packers includes an emphasis on green as a primary team color, having discarded his predecessor Curly Lambeau's blue-and-gold uniforms:

During the December 1952 game against the Rams in Los Angeles, the Packers arrived with only their gold jerseys, similar in shade to what the Rams normally wore at home. Both teams wore gold and the Rams played the game under protest; with a strong second half Los Angeles won by 18 points.

Kelly green uniforms were worn in the first game of the 1950 season; Vince Lombardi is credited with introducing the present shade of dark green in 1959.

Pittsburgh Steelers
Ronzani was hired in March 1954 as the backfield coach for the Pittsburgh Steelers, under head coach Joe Bach. After three straight home defeats to open the pre-season, the third a 36–14 loss to the lowly Packers, Bach resigned during training camp in late August. He was succeeded by line coach Walt Kiesling, a previous head coach with the team.

The Steelers won four of five to open the 1954 regular season, but then lost six of the final seven and finished at 5–7, fourth in the Eastern Conference. With the fast start, attendance in Pittsburgh was high and the season was profitable; days before the final game, Kiesling was rewarded by owner Art Rooney with a new two-year contract, estimated at $12,000 per year. Less than two weeks after the final game, Ronzani was encouraged by Rooney to resign.

Death
Ronzani had heart surgery at the Mayo Clinic in 1968, and died in 1975 at age 66. He was buried at Cemetery Park in Iron Mountain.

References
Citations

Sources
An article believed to be from the Milwaukee Tribune written by Barb Schumaker.
Larry D. Names book; "The History Of The Green Bay Packers", Subtitled "The Shameful Years", Ptd. 1995.

External links
 
 

1909 births
1975 deaths
American football halfbacks
American football quarterbacks
American men's basketball players
Green Bay Packers general managers
Green Bay Packers head coaches
Chicago Bears coaches
Chicago Bears players
Marquette Golden Avalanche football players
Marquette Golden Eagles men's basketball players
Pittsburgh Steelers coaches
National Football League general managers
College men's track and field athletes in the United States
People from Iron Mountain, Michigan
Basketball players from Michigan
Players of American football from Michigan
American people of Italian descent